Warren James Bullock (born January 12, 1965) is an English professional ballroom dancer and dance teacher, most widely known for the TV series Baby Ballroom and as the founder of Zig Zag Dance Factory in Lower Penn, Wolverhampton.

Early life
Warren James Bullock was born on January 12, 1965, in Stoke-on-Trent, Staffordshire to Maurice Bullock and Jean Bullock (née Beaumont), owners of a local pub.

At the age of 19, he met his last partner (and now wife) Jane (née Phillips) at a studio in Birmingham run by competitive coaches Robin Short and Rita Last, who introduced them. Still financed by his parents, Bullock had a string of jobs; of note was work as an airbrush artist.

Career

Competitive dancing and early teaching
Bullock and his wife Jane reached high levels of success in competitive dancing, including becoming British Champions in ballroom dancing. The couple were also featured on the TV series Come Dancing from 1988 to 1994, as well as a variety of other roles throughout film and television. Bullock retired from competitive dancing in 1997 to focus on teaching.

From the 90s to the mid 2010s, Bullock became known for teaching Latin and ballroom dancing onboard cruise ships.

Zig Zag Dance Factory
In 1994, Warren and his wife Jane started Zig Zag Dance Factory, a Latin and ballroom dance school. This was started initially as a way of earning an income to continue competing. The school is located in Lower Penn, Wolverhampton, and has notably trained with a wide number of professional dancers on Strictly Come Dancing. Since 2014, Bullock has hosted an annual awards event; The Galaxy Classique awards.

Together with his wife Jane, Bullock taught Ballroom and Latin American dancing in schools (including King Edward VI High School for Girls in Edgbaston) and Glebefields Primary School in Tipton where they pioneered the teaching of ballroom dancing in schools, before launching the concept to the Ballroom Dancers Federation which initiated dance being included into the curriculum.

Baby Ballroom
Bullock and Zig Zag Dance Factory became internationally known with the TV series Baby Ballroom, which showcased the school's training of younger children and the world of children's competitive Latin and ballroom dancing. Baby Ballroom ran for 2 seasons and a Christmas special from 2017 on the British TV channel 5star, as well as through the online streaming service Netflix.

Family

Warren is married to Jane Phillips Bullock (née Phillips), his professional dancing partner; they married in 1995. He lives in Lower Penn, Wolverhampton with Jane and their triplet children Savannah, India and Alicia, born 29 February 2000.

Philanthropy and community work

Warren Bullock supports and raises money for Starlight Children's Foundation. Through his Zig Zag Dance school, in 2019 Warren created "Strictly Ability"  the first open competition for children with special needs and disabilities.

Bullock created and organised the Global Internet Dance Championships to unite dancers from around the world during the coronavirus pandemic. This free to enter competition drew over 200 entries from around the world with competitors submitting their entry on either Facebook or YouTube.

Awards and achievements

Warren Bullock and his wife Jane have received two Carl Alan Awards in both amateur dancing and professional teaching. The first Carl Alan Award was in 1993 for Amateur Ballroom, and the second was in the category of "Ballroom, Latin and Sequence Teacher" and was presented to Warren and Jane on 10 February 2009. They are winners of the Le Classique du Dance Awards 2008.

Filmography

Film

Television

References

External links
  Zig Zag Dance Factory

 (YouTube)
Strictly Manx
Flixable
Baby Ballroom on Netflix

1965 births
Living people
British ballroom dancers
English male dancers
Dance teachers
People from Stoke-on-Trent